Utahime 3: Shūmaku (Finale) (歌姫3 〜終幕) is the cover album by Japanese singer Akina Nakamori. It was released on 3 December 2003 under the Universal Music Japan's sub-label KittyMe. It's Nakamori's third and final cover album from the Utahime cover album series. The cover choice consist of the songs released between 1960s and 1990s.

The album was released in 2-disc, second disc includes instrumental version of the songs arranged by Akira Senju.

In 2004 was released CD-Box Utahime Complex Box Empress which includes all Utahime albums, in 2007 released compilation album Utahime Best: 25th Anniversary Selection. In 2014, some of the songs from Utahime3: Shuumaku were included in the compilation album All Time Best: Utahime Cover.

Stage performances
In 2005, Nakamori performed Odoriko, Kasa ga nai and Mado in special live Special Live 2005 Empress at CLUB eX. In 2009, Nakamori performed Koi no Yokan in the NHK music documentary SONGS.

Chart performance
Utahime 3: Shūmaku debuted at number 25 on the Oricon Album Weekly Chart and sold over 31,700 copies.

Track listing

References

2003 albums
Japanese-language albums
Akina Nakamori albums
Albums produced by Akina Nakamori
Universal Music Japan albums